Soukka (Finnish) or Sökö (Swedish) is an 
underground station on the western metro extension (Länsimetro) of the Helsinki Metro in Finland. The station is opened on 3 December 2022, located 1.3 kilometres southeast from Espoonlahti metro station and 1.6 kilometres west from Kaitaa metro station.

References

External links
Länsimetro work in progress

 

Helsinki Metro stations
2022 establishments in Finland